The 1956–57 Hovedserien was the 13th completed season of top division football in Norway.

Overview
It was contested by 16 teams, and Fredrikstad won the championship, their seventh league title. Sarpsborg FK was one of three teams to have appeared in all 12 completed editions of the top division, but was relegated at the end of the season.

Teams and locations
Note: Table lists in alphabetical order.

League tables

Group A

Group B

Results

Group A

Group B

Championship final
Fredrikstad 6–1 Odd

References
Norway - List of final tables (RSSSF)

Eliteserien seasons
Norway
1
1